Mustafa Kemal University, abbreviated as MKU, is a public university established 1992 at Antakya, Hatay Province in southern Turkey. It is named after the founder of the Turkish Republic, Mustafa Kemal Atatürk.

It comprises eleven faculties, five four-year colleges, 15 two-year vocational schools, three post-graduate institutes, nine research centers, a conservatory and a university hospital. In 2010 the student enrolment of Mustafa Kemal University reached approximately 24,900 in total. The total size of the teaching faculty is 967. In 2007, the Faculty of Engineering moved from Antakya to İskenderun.

The MKU is an active member of European University Association (EUA) since 2001.

Organization

Faculties

Colleges
Four-year colleges of MKU are:

Vocational colleges 
Two-year vocational schools of higher education linked with the MKU are:

Institutes 
Institutes are for Post-Graduate (Masters and Doctoral) studies.

Affiliations
The university is a member of the Caucasus University Association.

References

External links 
 Hatay Mustafa Kemal Üniversitesi

State universities and colleges in Turkey
Buildings and structures in Hatay Province
Things named after Mustafa Kemal Atatürk
Antakya
Educational institutions established in 1992
1992 establishments in Turkey